K156 or K-156 may refer to:

K-156 (Kansas highway), a state highway in Kansas
HMCS Chicoutimi (K156), a former Canadian Navy ship